The Dominic Republic women's national under-18 volleyball team represents Dominic Republic in international women's volleyball competitions and friendly matches under the age 18 and it is ruled by the Dominican Volleyball Federation That Follow the North, Central America and Caribbean Volleyball Confederation NORCECA and also is a part of The Federation of International Volleyball FIVB.

Results

FIVB U18 World Championship
 Champions   Runners up   Third place   Fourth place

NORCECA Girls U18 Championship
 Champions   Runners up   Third place   Fourth place

Pan-American U18 Cup
 Champions   Runners up   Third place   Fourth place

Team

Current squad
The following is the Dominican roster in the 2019 Girls' Youth Pan-American Volleyball Cup.

Head Coach:  Alexandre Ceccato

References

External links
 www.fedovoli.org 

Volleyball
National women's under-18 volleyball teams
Volleyball in the Dominican Republic